Addanki Gangadhara Kavi was a Telugu language poet and writer of a 16th century, from Hyderabad, India. He was the court poet of Qutb Shahi Sultan Ibrahim Quli Qutb Shah Wali of Golconda for whom Addanki dedicated his work Tapathi Samvaranopaakhyaana-(1565 A.D) and honored the Sultan with the title Malki BhaRama.

Tapathi Samvaranopaakhyaana-(1565 A.D) are long poems which praises the characters of Ibrahim Quli Qutb Shah Wali as a king, it describes the Ibrahim’s political and social aspects, a commentary of Ibrahim’s campaigns of Rajahmundry, Srikakulam and Orissa, with miniature pictures of Qutb Shahi Sultan's court.

References 

Telugu poets
History of Telangana
Year of death unknown
Year of birth unknown
16th-century Indian poets